Thereva nobilitata is a species of fly from the family Therevidae. It is commonly known as the common stiletto.

References

Therevidae
Brachyceran flies of Europe
Insects described in 1775
Taxa named by Johan Christian Fabricius